Thomas Christopher Boyd (14 August 1916 – 15 March 2004) was a British Labour Party politician.

Boyd unsuccessfully fought Isle of Thanet in 1950 and Harborough at the 1951 general election.

At the 1955 general election, he was elected as Member of Parliament (MP) for Bristol North West, defeating the sitting Conservative MP Gurney Braithwaite.  He served in the House of Commons for only four years, losing his seat at the 1959 general election to the Conservative Martin McLaren.

After losing his seat at the 1959 general election, Boyd moved to Moffat, Scotland. He then retired to Appledore, Kent.

References

External links 
 

1916 births
2004 deaths
Labour Party (UK) MPs for English constituencies
UK MPs 1955–1959
Politicians from Edmonton
People from Appledore, Kent
People from Moffat